The 2002 St. Petersburg Open was a tennis tournament played on indoor hard courts at the Petersburg Sports and Concert Complex in Saint Petersburg in Russia and was part of the International Series of the 2002 ATP Tour. The tournament ran from October 21 through October 27, 2002.

Finals

Singles

 Sébastien Grosjean defeated  Mikhail Youzhny 7–5, 6–4
 It was Grosjean's 2nd title of the year and the 5th of his career.

Doubles

 David Adams /  Jared Palmer defeated  Irakli Labadze /  Marat Safin 7–6(10–8), 6–3
 It was Adams' 2nd title of the year and the 18th of his career. It was Palmer's 3rd title of the year and the 26th of his career.

External links
 Official website  
 Official website 
 ATP Tournament Profile

St. Petersburg Open
St. Petersburg Open
St. Petersburg Open
St. Petersburg Open